Narayanan Nadar Paul Vasanthakumar (born 15 March 1955) is from Palliyadi, Kanyakumari District of Tamil Nadu, India and was the Chief Justice of the Jammu and Kashmir High Court. He retired on 14 March 2017. He was appointed an additional judge of High Court of Madras on December, 2005 and permanent judge on 20 April 2007. He took oath as the chief justice of the High Court of Jammu and Kashmir in February 2015.

Career 
He was enrolled as an Advocate in the year 1980 and was Junior to Late Mr. T. Martin. He was given an honorary post of member in Ecclesiastical Synod Courts, C.S.I. Specialist in Service Law, Labor Law and Education matters. He held the post of Senior Standing Counsel for Tamil Nadu Public Service Commission and also Standing Counsel for Central Government. In 2005, he was appointed Additional Judge of High Court of Madras and later in 2007 as Permanent Judge. During his term in the High Court of Madras, he had delivered several important judgements on several legal issues.

Notable Judgments 
Some important judgements pronounced by Justice Vasanthakumar include statutory prohibition for failing a student and retaining (him) in the same standard, refusing permission for granite quarrying in hilly areas, making it compulsory for banks to provide loans to students for educational purposes.

References 

Living people
1955 births
20th-century Indian judges
People from Kanyakumari district
Judges of the Madras High Court
Chief Justices of the Jammu and Kashmir High Court